Jean-Pierre Dogliani (17 October 1942 – 17 April 2003) was a French footballer who played as a midfielder. He was caretaker manager for RC Strasbourg for two games in September and October 1988.

Honours
Angers
French Division 2: 1968–69
Bastia
 Coupe de France runner-up: 1971–72

External links
 Profile

1942 births
2003 deaths
French footballers
France international footballers
Association football midfielders
Olympique de Marseille players
Angers SCO players
SC Bastia players
AS Monaco FC players
Paris Saint-Germain F.C. players
Footballers from Marseille
French people of Italian descent
French football managers
RC Strasbourg Alsace managers